This is a list of architects of the Russian Federation, Soviet Union, Russian Empire, Tsardom of Russia and Grand Duchy of Moscow, both ethnic Russians and people of other ethnicities. This list also includes those who were born in the ///Tsardom of Russia/Grand Duchy of Moscow but later emigrated, and those who were born elsewhere but immigrated to the country and/or worked there for a significant period of  time.

Attested biographies of architects in Russian history date back to 1475, when Aristotile Fioravanti, a native of Bologna, arrived in Moscow to build the Dormition Cathedral of the Moscow Kremlin. Foreign architects had a notable place in Russian and Soviet history, especially in the last quarter of the 18th century (Charles Cameron, Bartolomeo Rastrelli, Carlo Rossi and others) and in the first quarter of the 20th century (Mies van der Roe, Erich Mendelsohn, Ernst May and others). This list includes foreign architects whose primary, and most tangible work materialized on Russian soil (i.e. Cameron, Rastrelli, Rossi) while short-term assignments by visiting architects (Mies van der Roe, Mendelsohn, May) are omitted.

Alphabetical list



A

B

C

D

E

F

G

H

I

K

L

M

N

O

P

Q

R

S

T

U

V

Y

Z

See also
Russian architecture
List of Russian artists
List of Russian explorers
List of Russian inventors
List of Russian language writers
Russian culture

Sources

References 

Architects
Russian
Lists